Ryan Graham Pun Teague (born 24 January 2002) is an Australian professional footballer who plays as a central midfielder for the U23-team of Primeira Liga club Famalicão.

Club career

Sydney FC
Teague joined Sydney FC's academy at its inception, and progressed through the youth ranks, before being awarded a scholarship in September 2018. In September 2019, along with Marco Tilio and Harry van der Saag, Teague was awarded a Hyundai A-League scholarship contract, and was promoted to the senior squad. On 7 December 2019, Teague made his professional debut, coming off the bench for Luke Brattan in the 82nd minute of a 5–1 win over Brisbane Roar at Jubilee Oval.

Famalicão
On 30 January 2020, Teague signed for Portuguese side Famalicão. He made his first team debut on 24 July 2021 in a 1–0 Taça da Liga win against Feirense.

On 13 August 2021, Sporting da Covilhã announced the signing of Teague on a season long loan. His first appearance was in the Liga Portugal 2 game against Vilafranquense on 23 August 2021.

International career

Youth 
Teague was a fixture in the Joeys side from 2017 until the 2019 FIFA U-17 World Cup, where he captained the side to the round of 16, playing all 4 games, and culminating in a 4–0 defeat to France.

References

External links

Ryan Teague at ZeroZero 
Ryan Teague at Liga Portugal 

2002 births
Living people
Australian soccer players
Association football midfielders
Sydney FC players
F.C. Famalicão players
S.C. Covilhã players
National Premier Leagues players
A-League Men players
Liga Portugal 2 players
Australian expatriate soccer players
Expatriate footballers in Portugal
Australian expatriate sportspeople in Portugal